Carpintero is a Spanish surname:
 Santiago Carpintero Fernández
 Wilson Carpintero
 Los Carpinteros

Spanish words and phrases
Spanish-language surnames
Occupational surnames